Walker Riverside Academy is a co-educational secondary school and sixth form located in the Walker area of Newcastle upon Tyne, Tyne and Wear, England.

The school was previously granted specialist status as a Technology College, later also as an Arts College. In March 2018, Walker Technology College converted to academy status and was renamed Walker Riverside Academy, sponsored by the Tyne Coast Academies Trust. It continues to offer technology a specialism.

Walker Riverside Academy offers GCSEs and BTECs as programmes of study for pupils, while students in the sixth form have the option to study from a range of A-levels and further BTECs.

Walker is one of eleven schools to be rebuilt in the government's phase 2 PFI scheme of Newcastle Building Schools for the Future programme.

References

External links
Walker Riverside Academy official website

Secondary schools in Newcastle upon Tyne
Academies in Newcastle upon Tyne